Centaure was an 86-gun Bucentaure-class 80-gun ship of the line of the French Navy, designed by Sané.

She took part in operations of the Spanish expedition in 1823, along with Trident and Sirène, silencing fort Santi-Pietri. On 14 October 1823, she was renamed Santi-Pietri to commemorate the event. Santi-Pietri  was later used as a troopship, and as a prison hulk in Toulon from 1850, before being destroyed by fire on 4 January 1862.

References
 Jean-Michel Roche, Dictionnaire des Bâtiments de la flotte de guerre française de Colbert à nos jours, tome I

Ships of the line of the French Navy
Ships built in France
Bucentaure-class ships of the line
1818 ships
Maritime incidents in January 1862
Ship fires
Shipwrecks of France